In enzymology, a mRNA guanylyltransferase is an enzyme that catalyzes the chemical reaction

GTP + (5')ppPur-mRNA  diphosphate + G(5')pppPur-mRNA

Thus, the two substrates of this enzyme are GTP and (5')ppPur-mRNA, whereas its two products are diphosphate and G(5')pppPur-mRNA.

This enzyme belongs to the family of transferases, specifically those transferring phosphorus-containing nucleotide groups (nucleotidyltransferases).op The systematic name of this enzyme class is GTP:mRNA guanylyltransferase. Other names in common use include mRNA capping enzyme, messenger RNA guanylyltransferase, and Protein 2.

Structural studies

References

 
 
 
 
 

mRNA guanylyltransferase
Enzymes of known structure